Attorney General Harris may refer to:

Charles Coffin Harris (1822–1881), Attorney General of the Kingdom of Hawaii
George E. Harris (1827–1911), Attorney General of Mississippi
Kamala Harris (born 1964), Attorney General of California

See also
General Harris (disambiguation)